Spermacoce ocymoides is a species of plant in the Rubiaceae. It is widespread in Maldives, India, Sri Lanka, Myanmar, Thailand, Vietnam, Malaysia, Indonesia, Philippines, New Guinea, Solomon Isles, Fiji, Samoa, Vanuatu.

References 

ocymoides
Taxa named by Nicolaas Laurens Burman